Cell division protein kinase 3 is an enzyme that in humans is encoded by the CDK3 gene.

Function 

CDK3 complements cdc28 mutants of Saccharomyces cerevisiae suggesting that it may be involved in cell cycle control.  CDK3 can phosphorylate histone H1 and interacts with an unknown type of cyclin.

References

Further reading

External links
 
 
 

Cell cycle
Proteins
EC 2.7.11